Walter Eucken (17 January 1891 – 20 March 1950) was a German economist of the Freiburg school and father of ordoliberalism. He is closely linked with the development of the concept of "social market economy".

Early life
Walter Eucken was born on 17 January 1891 in Jena in Saxe-Weimar-Eisenach (present-day Thuringia), as son of the philosopher Rudolf Eucken (1846–1926), who won the 1908 Nobel Prize in Literature and his wife, Irene (1863–1941, née Passow), a painter. Walter had one sister and one brother, the chemist/physicist Arnold Eucken.

Walter grew up in an intellectually stimulating environment. His father was one of the most influential philosophers of the German Empire and read Aristotle with his sons in the original. Visitors to the family villa included Stefan George, Hugo von Hofmannsthal, Ernst Ludwig Kirchner, Edvard Munch and Ferdinand Hodler.

Walter Eucken studied Nationalökonomie (economics) at Kiel, Bonn and Jena and was awarded his doctorate at Bonn in 1914 (thesis: Verbandsbildung in der Seeschifffahrt). He served as an officer in World War I on both the western and eastern fronts.

Weimar Republic
After the war ended, Eucken went to Berlin University where he became a full professor in 1921 (thesis: Die Stickstoffversorgung der Welt). Eucken married the writer and philosopher Edith Erdsiek (b. 1896) in Berlin in 1920. They had two daughters and one son.

Like most in his family, he was a conservative nationalist and mistrusted the new republic. His mother and sister were active in the German National People's Party (DNVP). Eucken joined the party, but left after one year, though he stayed close to it. He also associated with the movement later known as Conservative Revolutionary movement. Eventually, Eucken came to distance himself from the conservative movement, in particular because its economic program was not to his liking: protectionism, client politics favouring  and large industry, völkische social partnership between workers and employers and a positive view of cartels.

In 1925, he moved to the Tübingen and in 1927 to the University of Freiburg where he remained for the rest of his life.

Nazi Germany
During the Nazi period, Martin Heidegger became rector (head of Freiburg University) and imposed the regime's policies. Eucken was vocal in opposing these in the university's Senat. Some of his lectures in the 1930s resulted in protests from the local Nazi student association.

After the Kristallnacht pogrom in 1938, Eucken was one of several Freiburg academics who banded together with several local priests in a so-called Konzil, where they debated the obligation of Christians to fight against tyranny. The Freiburg Circles had links to Dietrich Bonhoeffer and Carl Friedrich Goerdeler, key figures of the resistance against Hitler. Bonhoeffer asked Eucken,  and Constantin von Dietze to write an appendix to a secret memorandum, in which they worked out a post-war economic and social order. The central planning system of the Nazis was to be replaced with a liberal competitive system. If the attack of 20 July 1944 had succeeded, these plans would have been the basis of a new economic order. After the coup failed, Lampe and von Dietze were arrested and tortured by the Gestapo. Eucken, too, was arrested and interrogated twice but released. Two of his friends were executed.

Post-war era
In the aftermath of World War II, Eucken's theories influenced the reforms that are said to have set the stage for the Wirtschaftswunder. As a member of the advisory council to Ludwig Erhard, then economic director of the American-British zone of occupation, he helped in rebuilding the economic system in western Germany. He attended the founding conference of the Mont Pelerin Society and was elected one of the vice-presidents. One of Eucken's students,  was the author of the law that abruptly abolished price controls (Leitsätzegesetz) in June 1948.

Death and legacy
Eucken died of a heart attack on 20 March 1950 during a lecture series at the London School of Economics, UK.

The Walter Eucken Institut was founded four years after his death.

His papers were cared for by the Walter Eucken Archiv in Frankfurt. They have now been handed over to the Thüringer Universitäts- und Landesbibliothek.

Theory
Eucken's ordoliberalism, which is a special German variant of neoliberalism in its traditional definition, argues that the state has the task to provide the political framework for economic freedom to flourish. In contrast to laissez-faire, which by the 1930s had been observed to give rise to cartels and an undue concentration of power, ordoliberalism aims to put limits on the economic power of individuals, companies and associations. This is achieved through a legal and institutional framework, including maintenance of private property, enforcement of private contracts, liability, free entry to markets, and monetary stabilization. In this, the state should refrain from directing or intervening in the economic processes of daily practices, as in a centrally planned economy, but rather provide a well-functioning competitive Ordnung (order) in which private agents can act without frequent discretionary influence from the state.

From 1948 on it was further developed in the journal ORDO.

Works
 Kritische Betrachtungen zum deutschen Geldproblem, 1923
 "Nationalökonomie wozu?", in: Wissenschaft und Zeitgeist 10, 1938/1949
 Die Grundlagen der Nationalökonomie, 1939/1950
 "Wettbewerb als Grundprinzip der Wirtschaftsverfassung", in: Schmölders, G., ed., Der Wettbewerb als Mittel volkswirtschaftlicher Leistungssteigerung und Leistungsauslese (Berlin: Duncker & Humblot, 1942)
 "Die Soziale Frage", in: Salin, E., ed., Synopsis, Festgabe für A. Weber (Heidelberg: Lambert Schneider, 1948)
 "Die Wettbewerbsordnung und ihre Verwirklichung", in: Ordo 2, 1949
 "Technik. Konzentration und Ordnung der Wirtschaft", in: Ordo 3, 1950
 Unser Zeitalter der Mißerfolge, 1951
 Kapitaltheoretische Untersuchungen, 1934/1954 (as editor)

References

External links
 Walter Eucken Institute
 Walter Eucken Archive in Frankfurt am Main / Germany

1891 births
1950 deaths
Writers from Jena
People from Saxe-Weimar-Eisenach
German anti-fascists
Freiburg School economists
20th-century  German economists
University of Kiel alumni
University of Bonn alumni
University of Jena alumni
German Army personnel of World War I
German resistance members
German people of World War II
Member of the Mont Pelerin Society